Lugton High railway station was a railway station serving the hamlet of Lugton, East Ayrshire, Scotland as part of the Lanarkshire and Ayrshire Railway.

History 
The station opened on 1 May 1903 and was simply known as Lugton. It closed between 1 January 1917 and 2 March 1919 due to wartime economy, and upon the grouping of the L&AR into the London, Midland and Scottish Railway in 1923, it was renamed Lugton High on 2 June 1924. The station closed to passengers on 4 July 1932.

Little remains of this station today, aside from the stationmaster's house and related buildings, the abutments of a bridge crossing the A735 to the south, and a large embankment to the north.

Gree Goods station was located between Lugton and Barrmill, just to the south of the now demolished Gree Viaduct and near the clachan of that name.

2007 gallery

References

Notes

Sources 
 
 

Railway stations in Great Britain opened in 1903
Railway stations in Great Britain closed in 1917
Railway stations in Great Britain opened in 1919
Railway stations in Great Britain closed in 1932
Disused railway stations in East Ayrshire
Former Caledonian Railway stations